Robin Reid may refer to:

 Robin Reid (boxer)
 Robin Reid (cyclist)
 Robin Reid (criminal)
 Robin Reid (environmental scientist)

See also
Robin Reed, wrestler
Robin Reed (meteorologist)